Aangan , alternatively spelled Angan, is a period novel by Pakistani novelist and short story writer Khadija Mastoor. Published in 1962, it is hailed as a masterpiece of Urdu literature. It won Mastoor the 1963 Adamjee Literary Award for Urdu prose and has been translated into 13 languages. English translations of the novel by Daisy Rockwell titled Inner Courtyard and The Women's Courtyard were published in 2000 and 2018, respectively. A Pakistani TV series adaptation of the novel starring Mawra Hocane, Ahad Raza Mir, Ahsan Khan and Sajal Aly was aired on Hum TV from 2018 to 2019. Renewed interest in the novel caused it to become the number one bestseller in the country in 2019.

Adaptations 

A Pakistani TV series adaptation of the novel starring Mawra Hocane, Ahad Raza Mir, Ahsan Khan and Sajal Aly was aired on Hum TV from 2018 to 2019.

In India, a show of the same name based on the novel was created by DD Urdu and aired in mid 2018.

See also 
 Hajira Masroor
 Pir-e-Kamil
 Shahab Nama

References

External links 
 Aangan at Goodreads

Pakistani novels
Urdu-language novels
Urdu-language literature
Urdu-language fiction
Pakistani fiction
1962 novels
Novels set in British India
Novels set in Pakistan
Novels set in the 20th century
Novels set in the 1940s
1960s novels
Partition of India in fiction
Recipients of the Adamjee Literary Award